This is a list of Spanish football transfers for the 2005–06 La Liga season. Transfers are only allowed in limited transfer windows in summer and winter.

Deportivo Alavés
In:
 Pacheco - On loan from Albacete Balompié
 Ibon Begoña - Signed from Gimnástic de Tarragona
 Georgiev - On loan from Slavia Sofia
 Elton Giovanni - Signed from Santos FC
 Costanzo - Signed from River Plate
 Gaspar - Signed from Albacete Balompié
 Mena - Signed from Xerez CD
 Jandro - Signed from Celta de Vigo
 Juanito - Signed from Málaga CF
 Wesley - Signed from Peñafiel
 Poli - Signed from RCD Mallorca
 Lacen - Signed from Valence FC
 Gnakpa - Signed from Racing de Santander
 Antchouet  - Signed from  Os Belenenses
 Pellegrino - Signed from Liverpool F.C.
 Aloisi - Signed from CA Osasuna
 Arturo - Signed from Racing de Santander

Out:
 Wesley - On loan to Vitória Guimarães
 Antchouet - On loan to Vitória Guimarães
 Bernardo - On loan to CD Tenerife
 Orlandi - On loan to FC Barcelona
 David Sanchéz - Return to FC Barcelona
 Santamaria - Return to FC Barcelona
  Sarr - Return to RC Lens
 Nacho - Transferred to Racing de Ferrol
 Abel - Transferred to UD Salamanca
 Kiko - Transferred to Poli Ejido
 Epitié - Transferred to CD Castellon
 Angel - Transferred to Ciudad de Murcia
 Juan Pablo - Transferred to  CD Numancia
 Flotta - Transferred to  Deportes Tolima

Athletic Club Bilbao
In:
  Aduriz - Signed - from Real Valladolid
  Bordas - Return from Terrassa
  Zubiaurre - Signed from Real Sociedad (Pending...)
  Mendilíbar - Signed from  - Eibar
  Angulo  - Return from Gimnástic
  Expósito - Signed from CA Osasuna

Out:
  Ibon Gutiérrez - On loan to CD Numancia
  Tarantino - On loan from CD Numancia
  Javi González - On loan to FC Ashdod
  Pampín - On loan to Real Union
  Jonan - On loan to CD Castellon
  Cesar - On loan to SD Eibar
  Azkorra - On loan to CD Numancia
  Arriaga - On loan to SD Eibar
  Moya - On loan to SD Eibar
  Solabarrieta - On loan to SD Eibar
  Del Horno - Transferred to Chelsea
  Ezquerro - Transferred to  FC Barcelona
  Ernesto Valverde - To ¿?
  Oskar Vales -  Retired

Atlético Madrid
In:
  Mateja Kežman - Signed from Chelsea F.C.
  Maxi Rodríguez - Signed from RCD Espanyol
  Galletti - Signed from Real Zaragoza
  Valera - Signed from Real Murcia
  Martin Petrov - Signed from Wolfsburg
  Gabi  - Return from  Getafe

Out:
  Braulio - On loan to RCD Mallorca
  Arizmendi - Transferred to Deportivo de La Coruña
  Jacobo - On loan to UE Lleida
  Raúl Medina - On loan to Ciudad de Murcia
   Kiki Musampa  - On loan to  Manchester City
  Jorge Larena - On loan to Celta Vigo
  Pínola  - On loan to Nürnberg
  Richard Núñez - On loan to Cruz Azul
  Toché - On loan to Hércules CF
  Sosa - On loan to CA Osasuna
  Nano - On loan to  Getafe CF
  Contra  - On loan to Getafe CF
  Salva - Return to  Valencia
  Paunovic  - Transferred to Getafe CF
  Aragoneses - Transferred to Elche CF
  Novo - Transferred to Real Sociedad
  Grønkjær - Transferred to Stuttgart
  Aguilera - Retired
  Sergi - Retired

FC Barcelona
In:
   Santiago Ezquerro - Signed from Athletic de Bilbao
   Mark van Bommel - Signed from PSV Eindhoven

Out:
  Damià Abella - On loan to Racing de Santander
  Javier Saviola - On loan to Sevilla FC
  Fernando Navarro - On loan to RCD Mallorca
  Rüştü Reçber - On loan to Fenerbahçe
  Sergio Santamaría - On loan to Albacete Balompié
  Oscar Lopez - On loan to Real Betis
  Ramón Ros - On loan to UE Lleida
  Pedro Mario - On loan to Real Valladolid
  Dani Tortolero - Transferred to Gimnàstic de Tarragona
  Fabio Rochemback - Transferred to Middlesbrough
  Gerard López Segú - Transferred to AS Monaco
  Juan Román Riquelme - Transferred to Villarreal CF
  Sergio García - Transferred to Real Zaragoza
  David Sánchez Rodríguez - Transferred to Albacete Balompié
  Demetrio Albertini - Retired

Real Betis
In:
 Robert - On loan from PSV Eindhoven
 Tardelli - On loan from São Paulo FC
 Miguel Angel - Signed from Málaga CF
 Rivera - Signed from Levante UD
 Xisco - Signed from Valencia CF
 Nano - Signed from Getafe CF
 Juanlu - Signed from CD Numancia
 Oscar López - On loan from FC Barcelona

Out:
 Oliveira  - On loan to São Paulo FC
 Juanlu - On loan to Albacete Balompié
 Jaime - On loan to UD Las Palmas
 David Llano - On loan to Real Jaén
 Pablo Niño - On loan to CD Numancia
 Denilson - Transferred to Girondins de Bordeaux
 Benjamín - Transferred to Cadiz CF
 Prats - Transferred to Mallorca
 Ismael - Transferred to Xerez CD
 Ito - Transferred to RCD Espanyol
 Mingo  - Transferred to Albacete Balompié
 Joao Tomás - Transferred to Sporting de Braga
 Tote - Transferred to Valladolid CF
 Tais - Retired
 Alfonso - Retired

Cadiz CF
In:
 Vella - Signed from Newell's Old Boys
 Morán - Signed from Racing de Santander
 Lobos - Signed from Gimnasia y Esgrima La Plata
 Alex Medina - Signed from Nacional de Montevideo
 Acuña - Signed from Olimpia
 Ivan Ania - Signed from Gimnastic
 Mario Silva - Signed from Recreativo de Huelva
 Limia - Signed from Arsenal de Sarandí
 Bezares - Signed from Sevilla FC
 Bertran - Signed from RCD Espanyol
 Berizzo Signed from Celta de Vigo
 Benjamín - On loan from Real Betis
 Estoyanoff - On loan from Valencia CF

Out:
 Bertran - On loan to Lorca Deportiva
 Manolo Pérez - Transferred to Hércules CF
 Solano - On loan to Leganés
 Miguel García - On loan to CD Castellón
 Velázquez - On loan to Lorca Deportiva
 Samba - On loan to Málaga B
 Ezequiel - On loan to Málaga B
 De Gomar - On loan to Rayo Vallecano
 Fredi - Return to Sevilla FC
 Armada - Transferred to Ciudad de Murcia
 Dani Navarrete - Transferred to Hércules CF

Celta de Vigo
In:
  Roberto - Signed from Guaraní
  Iriney - Signed from Rayo Vallecano
  Nuñez - Signed from Liverpool F.C.
  Perera  - Signed from RCD Mallorca
  Baiano - Signed from Málaga CF
  Placente - Signed from Bayer Leverkusen
  Canobbio - Signed from Valencia CF
  Javi Guerrero - Signed from Racing de Santander
  Esteban - Signed from Sevilla FC
  Daniel de Ridder - Signed from Ajax
  Carlos Vela - On loan from Arsenal F.C.
  Jorge Larena - On loan from Atlético de Madrid
  Jose Enrique - On loan from Valencia CF
  Silva - On loan from Valencia CF
  Lequi - On loan from SS Lazio

Out:
  Isaac - On loan to Racing de Ferrol
  Bouzón - On loan to Recreativo de Huelva
  Jorge Rodríguez - On loan to Racing de Ferrol
  Orlando Quintana - On loan to Lorca Deportiva
  Toni Moral - On loan to CD Tenerife
  Israel - On loan to Córdoba CF
  Vryzas  - Return to ACF Fiorentina
  Nagore - Return to RCD Mallorca
  Sava - Return To Fulham
  Capucho - Return to Rangers
  Roger - Return to Corinthians
  Manolo - Transferred to Racing de Ferrol
  Berizzo - Transferred to Cádiz CF
  Jandro - Transferred to Deportivo Alavés
  Jose Ignacio - Transferred to CD Logroñés

Deportivo de La Coruña
In:
  Gallardo - On loan from Sevilla FC
  Arizmendi - Signed from Atletico de Madrid
  Taborda - Signed from Defensor de Montevideo
  De Guzman - Signed from Hannover 96
  Juanma - Signed from Racing de Santander
  Rubén - Return from Albacete Balompié
  Momo - Return from Albacete Balompié

Out:
   Scaloni - On loan to West Ham United
  Pablo Amo - Transferred to Real Valladolid
  Changui - On loan to Xanthi FC
  Abreu - Transferred to Dorados
  Luque - Transferred to Newcastle United
  Pandiani - Transferred to Birmingham City
  Fran - Retired
  Mauro Silva - Retired

RCD Espanyol
In:
 Walter Pandiani - Signed from Birmingham City F.C.
 Luis García - Signed from RCD Mallorca
 Armando Sá - Signed from Villarreal CF
 Zabaleta - Signed from San Lorenzo de Almagro
 Costa - Signed from Olympique de Marseille
 Jofre - Signed from Levante UD
 Riera - Signed from Girondins de Bordeaux
 Ito - Signed from Real Betis
 Juanfran - On loan from Real Madrid
 Hurtado - Return from Eibar
 Iraizoz - Return from Eibar

Out:
 Soldevilla  - Transferred to Polideportivo Ejido
 Jonathan Soriano - On loan to UD Almería
 Toni Velamazán - Transferred to UD Almería
 Morales - Transferred to Gimnàstic de Tarragona
 Riera - On loan to Manchester City F.C.
 Héctor - On loan to Racing de Ferrol
 Carlos García - On loan to UD Almería
 Serrano - On loan to Racing de Santander
 Miñambres - Return to Real Madrid
 Maxi Rodríguez - Transferred to Atlético de Madrid
 Hugo Benjamín Ibarra - Transferred to Boca Juniors
 Bertran - Transferred to Cádiz CF
 Erwin Lemmens - Transferred to  Olympiacos
 Àlex Fernández - Transferred to  Xerez CD
 Dani - Transferred to Olympiacos
 Raducanu - Transferred to FC Vaslui
 Raúl Molina - Transferred to Rayo Vallecano
 Amavisca - Retired

Getafe CF
In:
  Jaja Coelho - Signed from Westerlo FC
  Celestini - Signed from UD Levante
  Paredes - Signed from Real Madrid B
  Paunovic  - Signed from Atletico de Madrid
  Rebollo - Signed from San Sebastián de los Reyes
  Luis García  - Signed from Real Zaragoza
  Alberto - Signed from Málaga B
  Güiza - Signed from Ciudad de Murcia
  Matellán - Signed from Boca Juniors
  Contra - On loan from Atlético de Madrid
  Redondo - On loan from Valencia CF
  Nano - On loan from Atletico de Madrid
  Gavilán - On loan from Valencia CF
  Calatayud - On loan from Málaga CF

Out:
  Albiol - Return to Valencia CF
  Gabi - Return to Atlético de Madrid
  Aragoneses - Return to Atlético de Madrid
  Kome - Return to RCD Mallorca
  Gallardo - Return  To   Sevilla FC
  Yordi - Transferred to RCD Mallorca
  Alberto - Transferred to Elche CF
  Sánchez Broto - Transferred to  Hércules CF
  Yanguas - Transferred to CD Numancia
  Nano - Transferred to Betis Balompié
  Quique Medina - Transferred to Elche CF
  Asen - Transferred to Extremadura

Real Madrid
In:
  Cassano - Signed from A.S. Roma
  Cicinho - Signed from São Paulo
  Carlos Diogo - Signed from  CA River Plate
  Pablo García - Signed from CA Osasuna
  Júlio Baptista - Signed from Sevilla FC
  Robinho - Signed from Santos FC
  Sergio Ramos - Signed from Sevilla FC
  Carlos Sánchez - Return from Polideportivo Ejido
  Óscar Miñambres - Return from RCD Espanyol

Out:

  Borja Fernández - On loan to RCD Mallorca
  Javier Portillo - On loan to Club Brugge KV
  Juanfran - On loan to RCD Espanyol
  Carlos Sánchez - On loan to Unión Deportiva Almería
  César Sánchez - Transferred to Real Zaragoza
  Albert Celades - Transferred to Real Zaragoza
  Santiago Solari - Transferred to FC Internazionale
  Walter Samuel - Transferred to FC Internazionale
  Luís Figo - Transferred to FC Internazionale
  Michael Owen - Transferred to Newcastle United

Málaga CF
In:
 Jorge Ribeiro - On loan from Dinamo Moscow
 Antonio López - On loan from Sevilla FC
 Gabriel - Signed from Fluminense
 Bóvio - Signed from Santos FC
 Anderson - loaned from Everton
 Paco Esteban - Signed to Málaga B
 Morales - Signed from CA Osasuna
 Salva - Signed from Valencia CF
 Pablo Couñago - Signed from Ipswich Town
 Hidalgo - Signed from CD Tenerife
 Nacho - Return from Levante UD

Out:
 Paco Esteban - On loan to Ciudad de Murcia
 Calatayud - On loan to Getafe CF
 Tote - Return to  Real Betis
 Iznata - Transferred to Rayo Vallecano
 Alex Geijo - Transferred to Xerez CD
 Baiano - Transferred to Celta de Vigo
 Juanito - Transferred to Deportivo Alavés
 Michel - Transferred to Real Murcia
 Amoroso - Transferred to  São Paulo FC
 Wanchope - Transferred to Al-Gharrafa
 Miguel Ángel - Transferred to Real Betis

RCD Mallorca 
In:
  Braulio - On loan from Atletico de Madrid
  Basinas - Signed from Panathinaikos
  Nunes - Signed from Sporting Braga
  Pisculichi - Signed from Argentinos Juniors
  Doni - Signed from UC Sampdoria
  Yordi - Signed from Getafe CF
  Jonás Gutiérrez - Signed from Vélez Sársfield
  Tuzzio - Signed from River Plate
  Peralta - Signed from Instituto de Córdoba
  Potenza - On loan from  Internazionale
  Choutos - On loan from Internazionale
  Maciel  - Signed from Real Murcia
  Prats - Signed from Real Betis
  Toni González - Signed from Ciudad de Murcia
  Borja - On loan from Real Madrid
  Fernando Navarro - On loan from FC Barcelona
  Yoshito Okubo - loan extended from Cerezo Osaka
Out:
  Choutos - Return to Internazionale 
  Iuliano - Transferred to UC Sampdoria
  Ngom Kome - On loan to Ciudad de Murcia
  Cifuentes - On loan to Rayo Vallecano
  Iván Ramis - On loan to Real Valladolid
  Carmona - On loan to Real Valladolid
  Jorge López - Return to Valencia CF
  De los Santos - Return to Valencia CF
  Toni González - Transferred to Real Oviedo
  Luis García - Transferred to RCD Espanyol
  Nagore - Transferred to Levante UD
  Romeo - Transferred to CA Osasuna
  Poli - Transferred to Deportivo Alavés
  Felipe Melo - Transferred to Racing de Santander
  Westerveld - Transferred to Portsmouth
  Perera - Transferred to Celta de Vigo
   Fernando Correa - Transferred to Peñarol
  Delibasic - Transferred to Sporting Braga
  Marcos - Retired
  Nadal - Retired

CA Osasuna
In:
 Sosa - On loan from Atletico de Madrid
 Romeo - Signed from RCD Mallorca
 Ricardo - Signed from Manchester United
 Brit - Return from UD Salamanca

Out:
 Iván Rosado - On loan to Xerez CD
 Morales - Transferred to Málaga CF
 Aloisi - Transferred to Deportivo Alavés
 Expósito - Transferred to Athletic de Bilbao
 Pablo García - Transferred to Real Madrid
 Sanzol - Transferred to Albacete Balompié
 Jusué - Transferred to UD San Sebastián de los Reyes

Racing de Santander
In:
 Valencia - Signed from Gimnàstic de Tarragona
 Pablo Alfaro - Signed from Sevilla FC
 Ezequiel Garay - Signed from Newell's Old Boys
 Damia - On loan from FC Barcelona
 Pinilla - On loan from Sporting Lisbon
 Serrano - Signed from RCD Espanyol
 Stephane Dalmat - Signed from Internazionale
 Wilfred Dalmat - Signed from Grenoble
 Melo - Signed from RCD Mallorca
 Casquero - Signed from Sevilla FC
 Vitolo - Signed from CD Tenerife
 Pinillos - Signed from Levante UD
 Ruben Garcia - Signed from Zamora
 Neru - Signed from Sporting de Gijón
 Antoñito - On loan from Sevilla FC

Out:
 Toño - On loan to Recreativo de Huelva
 Fernando Marqués - On loan to Atletico de Madrid B
 Pablo Casar - Transferred to Real Valladolid
 Moran - Transferred to Cadiz CF
 Bertin - On loan to CD Tenerife
 Sierra - Transferred to Real Murcia
 Torrado - Transferred to Cruz Azul
 Mauro - Transferred to Racing de Ferrol
 Javi Guerrero - Transferred to Celta de Vigo
  Regueiro - Transferred to Valencia CF
 Juanma - Transferred to Deportivo de La Coruña
 Arthuro - Transferred to Deportivo Alavés
 Benayoun - Transferred to West Ham United
 Anderson - Transferred to Everton
 Parri - Return to Valencia CF
 Pedro Lopez - Return to Valencia CF
 Arizmendi - Return to Atletico de Madrid
 Carlos a. Pineda Escalera - Return to UNAM
 Eduardo Felipe Pineda - Return to UNAM

Sevilla FC 
In:
  Escudé - Signed from Ajax
  Dragutinovic - Signed from Standard Liège
  Kanouté - Signed from Tottenham Hotspurs
  David Prieto - Promoted from Sevilla B
  Kepa - Promoted from Sevilla B
  Diego Capel - Promoted from Sevilla B
  Luís Fabiano - Signed from F.C. Porto
  Maresca - Signed from Juventus
  Palop - Signed from Valencia
  Gallardo - loan return from Getafe
  Saviola - On loan from Barcelona

Out
  Gallardo - On loan to Deportivo
  Antonio López - On loan to Málaga
  Carlitos - Transferred to Hércules
  Pablo Alfaro - Transferred to Racing Santander
  Aranda - On loan to Albacete
  Redondo - Transferred to Hércules
  Óscar - Transferred to Poli Ejido
  Dani Bautista - On loan to Recreativo
  Marco Navas - On loan to Poli Ejido
  Antoñito - On loan to Racing Santander
  Sergio Ramos - Transferred to Real Madrid
  Darío Silva - Transferred to Portsmouth
  Esteban - Transferred to Celta
  Casquero - Transferred to Racing Santander
  Bezares - Transferred to Cádiz
  Júlio Baptista - Transferred to Real Madrid
  Barragán - Transferred to Liverpool
  Fredi  - Transferred to Castellón

Real Sociedad
In:
  Viáfara - On loan from Portsmouth
  Mark González - On loan from Liverpool
  Skoubo - Signed from Brøndby IF
  Stevanovic - Signed from NK Donzale
  Novo - Signed from Atletico de Madrid
  Cifuentes - Return from SD Eibar
  Garitano - Return from SD Eibar
  Oskitz - Return from SD Eibar

Out
  Adriano Rossato - On loan to Sporting Braga
  Domínguez - On loan to SD Eibar
  Romero - On loan to Banfield
  Llorente - On loan to Real Valladolid
  Mayrata - On loan to SD Eibar
  Bergara - On loan to SD Eibar
  Zubikarai - On loan to SD Eibar
  Luiz Alberto - Transferred to Santos FC
  Arteta - Transferred to Everton
  Zubiaurre - Transferred to Athletic de Bilbao
  Mladenovic - Transferred to Glasgow Rangers
  Alkiza - Retired
  Karpin - Retired

Valencia CF
In:
  Miguel - Signed from SL Benfica
  Kluivert - Signed from Newcastle United
  Villa  - Signed from Real Zaragoza
  Edu - Signed from Arsenal
  Regueiro - Signed from Racing de Santander
  Cerra - Signed from Alicante CF
  Mora - Signed from Levante UD
  Hugo Viana - On loan from Newcastle United
  Albiol - Return from Getafe CF
  Jorge López - Return from RCD Mallorca
  de los Santos - Return from RCD Mallorca 

Out:
  de los Santos - Transferred
  Caneira - On loan to Sporting C Portugal
  Di Vaio - On loan to AS Monaco FC
  Ruz - On loan to Gimnàstic de Tarragona
  Jose Enrique - On loan to Celta de Vigo
  Corradi - On loan to FC Parma
  Santa Cruz - On loan to Real Madrid C
  Amarilla - On loan to CD Badajoz
  Valle - On loan to Hércules CF
  Estoyanoff - On loan to Cadiz CF
  Fiore - On loan to ACF Fiorentina
  Silva - On loan to Celta de Vigo
  Gavilan - On loan to Getafe CF
  Redondo - On loan to Getafe CF
  Pedro López - Transferred to Real Valladolid
  Parri - Transferred to Albacete Balompié
  Canobbio - Transferred to Celta de Vigo
  Salva - Transferred to Málaga CF
  Sissoko - Transferred to Liverpool
  Xisco - Transferred to Real Betis
  Palop - Transferred to Sevilla FC

Villarreal CF
In:
 Guillermo Franco - Signed from Monterrey
 Josemi - Signed from  Liverpool
 Sebastián Viera - Signed from Nacional de Montevideo
 Juan Román Riquelme - Signed from Barcelona
 Mariano Barbosa - Signed from Banfield
 Alessio Tacchinardi - On loan from Juventus
 Jan Kromkamp - Signed from AZ
 Valencia - Signed from Club Deportivo El Nacional 
Out:
 Lucho Figueroa - On loan to River Plate
 Jan Kromkamp - Transferred to Liverpool
 Valencia - On loan to Recreativo de Huelva
 Tena - On loan to Poli Ejido
 Cases - On loan to Terrassa FC
 Pepe Reina - Transferred to Liverpool
 Battaglia - Transferred to Boca Juniors
 Armando Sá - Transferred to RCD Espanyol

Real Zaragoza
In:
  Albert Celades López- Signed from Real Madrid
  Ewerthon - Signed from Borussia Dortmund
  Sergio García - Signed from Barcelona
  César Sánchez - Signed from Real Madrid
  Corona - Return from Poli Ejido
  Valbuena - Return from Albacete Balompié
  Diego Milito - On loan from Genoa

Out
  Camacho - Transferred to UE Lleida
  Corona - Transferred to Albacete Balompié
  Piti - On loan to Ciudad de Murcia
  Jorge Pina - On loan to Málaga B
  Dorado - On loan to UE Lleida
  Javi Moreno - Transferred to Córdoba CF
  Iban Espadas - Transferred to Ciudad de Murcia
 } Galletti - Transferred to Atlético Madrid
  David Pirri - Transferred to Albacete Balompié
  Soriano - Transferred to UD Almería
  Villa - Transferred to Valencia CF
  Granero - Transferred to Xerez CD
  Luis Garcia - Transferred to Getafe CF
  Drulic - Transferred to Lokeren
  Ruben Falcón - Transferred to Villanueva CF
  César Láinez - Retired

2005–06
Trans
Spain
Spain